The Yale romanization of Mandarin is a system for transcribing the sounds of Standard Chinese, based on Mandarin Chinese varieties spoken in and around Beijing.  It was devised in 1943 by the Yale sinologist George Kennedy for a course teaching Chinese to American soldiers, and popularized by continued development of that course at Yale.
The system approximated Chinese sounds using English spelling conventions in order to accelerate acquisition of pronunciation by English speakers.

The Yale romanization was widely used in Western textbooks until the late 1970s; in fact, during the height of the Cold War, the use of the pinyin system over Yale romanization outside of China was regarded as a political statement or identification with the communist Chinese regime. The situation was reversed once the relations between the People's Republic of China and the West had improved. Communist China (PRC) became a member of the United Nations in 1971 by replacing Nationalist China (ROC). By 1979, much of the world adopted pinyin as the standard romanization for Chinese geographical names. In 1982, pinyin became an ISO standard; interest in Yale Mandarin declined rapidly thereafter.

Initials and finals

The tables below show the Yale Mandarin representation of each Chinese sound (in bold type), together with the corresponding IPA phonetic symbol (in square brackets), and equivalent representations in Zhùyīn Fúhào (bopomofo) and Hanyu Pinyin.

Initials
In Mandarin, stop and affricate consonants are all voiceless, but show a contrast between an aspirated and unaspirated series.
A much-criticized feature of the Wade–Giles system was its use of an apostrophe to indicate aspiration, as in the syllable t'a contrasting with the unaspirated ta.
The corresponding Yale spellings, ta and da respectively, suggest an approximation of the aspiration distinction to speakers of English, in which (unlike, say, Romance languages) voiceless consonants like t are pronounced with distinct aspiration when they occur at the start of a word, but voiced ones like d are pronounced unaspirated and with weakened voicing in that position.
Similar conventions were used in the earlier Gwoyeu Romatzyh system and the later pinyin system.
	 
The Yale system, like Wade-Giles and Gwoyeu Romatzyh, represents palatal consonants using letters for similar sounds with which they are in complementary distribution.
This is more intuitive for English speakers than the pinyin usage of the letters q and x wherein they no longer carry their expected values.
For example, q in pinyin is pronounced something like the ch in chicken and is written as ch in Yale Romanization. Xi in pinyin is pronounced something like English she; in Yale it is written as syi.

Finals

Syllables with syllabic fricatives are spelled jr ( zhi), chr ( chi), shr ( shi), r ( ri), dz ( zi), tsz ( ci), sz ( si), suggesting approximate pronunciations to English speakers.
In pinyin, these are all spelled -i.
For example, "knowledge" is spelled chih-shih in Wade–Giles and zhishi in pinyin, but in Yale romanization it is written jr-shr—only the last will elicit a near-correct pronunciation from an unprepared English speaker.

Tones

Tone was marked using diacritics whose shape suggested the corresponding pitch contour: ā (high level), á (rising), ǎ (falling-rising) and à (falling).
The same method was adopted by pinyin.

See also 
 Yale romanization of Cantonese
 Yale romanization of Korean
 Comparison of Chinese transcription systems

References

External links
 

Romanization of Chinese
Yale University
Writing systems introduced in 1943